Clofedanol (INN) or chlophedianol (BAN) is a centrally acting cough suppressant used in the treatment of dry cough. Clofedanol has local anesthetic, antispasmodic, and antihistamine properties, and may have anticholinergic effects at high doses.

Side effects
Adverse effects may include irritability, drowsiness, nightmares, vertigo, nausea or vomiting, visual disturbances or hallucinations, and urticaria. There are potential interactions with other anticholinergics, CNS depressants, and alcohol.

Pharmacology
Unlike many other antitussive drugs such as dextromethorphan, it binds poorly to the sigma-1 receptor.

Society and culture
Chlophedianol was approved for OTC status in 1987 by the FDA OTC monograph process and its safety and efficacy data are limited. It was formerly sold over-the-counter in the United States under the trade name Ulo, as a syrup with a dosage of 25 mg/5 mL; however, it has been withdrawn from the market.

It is marketed in Canada under the trade name Ulone. GM Pharmaceuticals owns the patents to 113 combinations with Chlophedianol and was the first company to launch the cough suppressant in the United States. 

It is sold in Japan as an over-the-counter drug under the name Coldrin. It has been marketed in Germany as Pectolitan and in Spain as Gentos.

See also
Azacyclonol

References 

Antitussives
H1 receptor antagonists
Chloroarenes
Tertiary alcohols
Dimethylamino compounds